A leadership election for the Tricolour Citizens' Movement was held on 28 September 2019. Václav Klaus Jr. the founder of the party was the only candidate. Election is held as party of party's founding assembly. Klaus received 185 votes of 188 and was elected the leader of Tricolour.

References

2019
2019 elections in the Czech Republic
Single-candidate elections
Elections in Brno
September 2019  events in the Czech Republic